Hermann Erhardt (January 9, 1903 in Landshut - November 30, 1958 in Vienna) was a German actor who played in more than 50 movies, among them Heimkehr and A Devil of a Woman.

Selected filmography
  The Monastery's Hunter (1935)
 Marriage Strike (1935)
 The Cabbie's Song (1936)
 Der Etappenhase (1937)
 Love is Duty Free (1941)
 Whom the Gods Love (1942)
Der Hofrat Geiger (1947)
 The Queen of the Landstrasse (1948)
 Ulli and Marei (1948)
 The Angel with the Trumpet (1948)
 White Gold (1949)
 Lambert Feels Threatened (1949)
 Vagabonds (1949)
 Cordula (1950)
 Bonus on Death (1950)
 Call Over the Air (1951)
  White Shadows (1951)
 Adventure in Vienna (1952)
 Anna Louise and Anton (1953)
 Daughter of the Regiment (1953)
 The Forester of the Silver Wood (1954)
 You Can No Longer Remain Silent (1955)
 Espionage (1955)
 Ich suche Dich (1956)

External links

1903 births
1958 deaths
German male film actors
20th-century German male actors